Pine Grove, Pennsylvania may refer to more than one place:

Pine Grove, Cambria County, Pennsylvania
Pine Grove, Clearfield County, Pennsylvania
Pine Grove, Lancaster County, Pennsylvania
Pine Grove, Perry County, Pennsylvania
Pine Grove, Schuylkill County, Pennsylvania
Pine Grove, Susquehanna County, Pennsylvania
Pine Grove, Venango County, Pennsylvania
Pine Grove Township, Schuylkill County, Pennsylvania
Pine Grove Township, Warren County, Pennsylvania

es:Pine Grove (condado de Schuylkill, Pensilvania)